German submarine U-674 was a Type VIIC U-boat of Nazi Germany's Kriegsmarine during World War II. The submarine was laid down on 7 April 1942 at the Howaldtswerke yard at Hamburg, launched on 8 May 1943, and commissioned on 15 June 1943 under the command of Oberleutnant zur See Harald Muhs.

Attached to 5th U-boat Flotilla based at Kiel, U-674 completed her training period on 31 January 1944 and was assigned to front-line service.

Design
German Type VIIC submarines were preceded by the shorter Type VIIB submarines. U-674 had a displacement of  when at the surface and  while submerged. She had two shafts and two  propellers.

U-674 was fitted with five  torpedo tubes (four fitted at the bow and one at the stern), fourteen torpedoes, one  SK C/35 naval gun, 220 rounds, and two twin  C/30 anti-aircraft guns. The boat had a complement of between forty-four and sixty.

Service history

The aircraft attacked, destroying the U-boat. All 49 crew members perished in the attack.

References

Bibliography

External links

German Type VIIC submarines
1943 ships
Ships built in Hamburg
U-boats commissioned in 1943
U-boats sunk in 1944
Maritime incidents in May 1944
World War II shipwrecks in the Norwegian Sea
U-boats sunk by British aircraft
U-boats sunk by depth charges
Ships lost with all hands
World War II submarines of Germany